Marko Tomić (born 28 October 1991) is a Serbian professional footballer who plays as a midfielder for FK Panevėžys.

Career

Žalgiris
He played for lithuanian Žalgiris in 2018 and 2019 seasons. In A lyga 2018 he scored six goals (played 29 matches) and in A lyga 2019 one goal (21 matches).

Irtysh Pavlodar
On 15 January 2020, Irtysh Pavlodar announced the signing of Tomić.

Honours 
Individual
A Lyga Team of the Year: 2018

References

External links
 
 Marko Tomić stats at utakmica.rs 
 
 

1991 births
Living people
Sportspeople from Pristina
Association football midfielders
Serbian footballers
FK Radnički Niš players
FK Radnik Surdulica players
FK Sinđelić Niš players
FK Čukarički players
FK Žalgiris players
FC Irtysh Pavlodar players
FC Alashkert players
FK Napredak Kruševac players
Serbian First League players
Serbian SuperLiga players
A Lyga players
Azerbaijan Premier League players
Armenian Premier League players
Serbian expatriate footballers
Serbian expatriate sportspeople in Switzerland
Serbian expatriate sportspeople in Lithuania
Serbian expatriate sportspeople in Kazakhstan
Serbian expatriate sportspeople in Armenia
Expatriate footballers in Switzerland
Expatriate footballers in Lithuania
Expatriate footballers in Kazakhstan
Expatriate footballers in Armenia